Shams Al Din Badran (19 April 1929 – 28 November 2020) was an Egyptian government official. He served as minister of defence of Egypt during Gamal Abdel Nasser's era and the unsuccessful Six-Day War of 1967. He was removed from his post during the war and later imprisoned. After his release he married a British woman and lived in "self-imposed exile" in the United Kingdom.

Early life and education
Badran was born on 19 April 1929. He attended a military academy and graduated in 1948. He participated in the 1947–1949 Palestine war and earned the Gold Medal of Merit from Farouk of Egypt as he fought at Al-Faluja. He was later sent on a military scholarship to France.

Career
Badran was the head of Egypt's military security services in the mid-1960s. He also served as the office manager of Field Marshal Abdul Hakim Amer under Gamal Abdel Nasser's presidency. Badran was one of the top aides of Amer. The Muslim Brotherhood accused him and Amer of responsibility for the torture of Brotherhood leaders who had been arrested due to their alleged plans to assassinate Nasser in 1965.

Badran was appointed minister of defence in Fall 1966, a few months before the Six-Day War in June 1967, replacing Abdel Wahab Al Bishri in the post. Amer had supported Badran's appointment. Badran was also named as the chief of Nasser's cabinet the same year. On 25 May 1967, Badran visited Moscow and met senior Soviet officials, including then Prime Minister Alexei Kosygin, to secure their support regarding a perceived Israeli threat. Badran resigned from office during the Six-Day War, and was replaced by Amin Howeidi as defence minister.

Following the defeat of the Egypt in the Six-Day War Badran was considered as a successor to the President Gamal Abdel Nasser.

Conviction
Badran along with other senior officials, including Amer, was detained on 25 August 1967 on charges of plotting against Nasser. However, they were tried for their roles during the six day war in 1967, including for Badran charges of torturing members of the Muslim Brotherhood. Badran appeared in court in two separate trials. He and Salah Nasr, former chief of intelligence and also part of Amer's faction, were convicted and sentenced to hard labour due to their roles in the defeat.

Following his release from prison by president Anwar Sadat on 23 May 1974, Badran left Egypt and went to live in London. Badran published part of his memoirs in the Kuwaiti newspaper Al-Siyasa in 2014.

Personal life
Badran married his first wife, Muna Rushdie, on 7 June 1962. The couple had one daughter named Hiba; they divorced in January 1989 by a court decision, as he had been absent for three years. Rushdie worked at The American University in Cairo. In the 1970s he  married a British woman with whom he had two children. Badran lived with his family in "self-imposed exile" in the United Kingdom, though one of his children moved to Saudi Arabia and another to the United States.

On 28 November 2020, Badran died in the University Hospitals Plymouth NHS Trust; however, he had asked to be buried in Egypt.

References

External links

20th-century Egyptian politicians
1929 births
2020 deaths
Defence Ministers of Egypt
Egyptian expatriates in the United Kingdom
Egyptian military leaders
Free Officers Movement (Egypt)
People from Giza
Egyptian politicians convicted of crimes
Egyptian prisoners and detainees